Cheo Yee How is a Malaysian politician from DAP. He is the member of Johor State Legislative Assembly for Pengkalan Rinting from 2013 to 2018 and Perling from 2018 to 2022.

Politics 
He was the Special helper of DAP Gelang Patah Liaison Committee from 2008 to 2012.

Election result

External links

References 

National University of Malaysia alumni
Democratic Action Party (Malaysia) politicians
Members of the Johor State Legislative Assembly
Malaysian people of Chinese descent
Living people
1984 births